The Mangalica (also Mangalitsa or Mangalitza) is a Hungarian breed of domestic pig. It was developed in the mid-19th century by crossbreeding breeds from the nearby Romanian Salonta (Hungarian: Nagyszalonta, colloquially Szalonta) and Hungarian Bakony with the European wild boar and the Serbian Šumadija breed. The Mangalica pig grows a thick, curly coat of hair. The only other pig breed noted for having a long coat is the extinct Lincolnshire Curly Coat pig of England.

History 
The blonde Mangalica variety was developed from older, hardy types of Hungarian pig (Bakonyi and Szalontai) crossed with the European wild boar and a Serbian breed (and later others like Alföldi) in Austria-Hungary (1833). That year, Prince of Serbia Miloš Obrenović sent 12 pigs of the autochthonous Serbian Šumadinka breed, ten sows and two boars. Pigs originally grown at the Prince's Topčider farm near Belgrade were used to create the Syrmian black lasa breed, also known as the black mangalica. Prince sent the animals to the Archduke Joseph, Palatine of Hungary, on whose estate the new breed was to be created.

The new, quick-growing, "fat-type" hog did not require any special care, which caused it to become very popular in Hungary. In 1927, the National Society of Fat-Type Hog Breeders (Mangalicatenyésztők Országos Egyesülete) was established, with the objective of improving the breed. Mangalica was the most prominent swine breed in the region until 1950 (30,000 of them were in Hungary in 1943). Since then, the popularity as well as the population of Mangalica has been decreasing, with the rising availability of food from farther away and refrigeration. In 1991, there were fewer than 200 remaining Mangalica in Hungary. Monte Nevado, a Spanish company began the breeding and recovery of Mangalica, and they were awarded with the Middle Cross of Hungary in 2016. Nowadays, the keeping of Mangalica has become a popular hobby.  Slightly over 7,000 Mangalica sows in Hungary are producing around 60,000 piglets a year.

Apart from Hungary, the Mangalica is present in Austria, Canada, the Czech Republic, Germany, The Netherlands, Romania, Serbia, Slovakia, Slovenia, Switzerland and the United States. In Serbia, the breed (which is called mangulica in Serbian) almost completely died out in the 1980s. In 1998, Mangalica were introduced into the Zasavica wetlands. They are left to roam free in a reservation, becoming partially feral, with cases of breeding with wild boars known. Came the early 2010s, their number grew to 1,000 in Zasavica and in populations kept in the individual farms in the Syrmia and Mačva regions. As both autochthonous Serbian breeds of domestic pig, Šiška and Mangalica's predecessor Šumadinka died out, Mangalica are considered the only surviving autochthonous breed in Serbia. In March 2006, seventeen of the pigs were exported from Austria to the United Kingdom, where they are registered with the British Pig Association. In 2007, some were exported to the United States.

Husbandry 

The Mangalica produces too little lean meat, so it has been gradually replaced by modern domestic breeds. It is usually fed with a mix of wild pasture, supplemented with potatoes and pumpkins produced on the farm.

The primary product made from this pig is sausage, usually packed in the pig's duodenum. The minced meat is seasoned with salt, pepper, sweet paprika, and other spices. It is then eaten in slices with pickled vegetables. The pork is also served braised with sauerkraut, potatoes, and stuffed peppers as a side dish. Farmers also produce smoked hams. The fresh meat tastes strong and juicy; the suckling pigs are much preferred for their good fresh meat qualities.

In Hungary, most Mangalica pigs are raised purely or semi-intensively.

Slaughter weight (for meat production) is generally achieved beyond 12 months of age.

Meat from the Mangalica can be easily found in Hungary, as Hungarian farmers produce about 60,000 animals each year.

Varieties 
There are currently three existing varieties of Mangalitsa, differing only by color. These differences are too small for them to be considered individual breeds. The three Mangalica varieties are: "blonde", "swallow-bellied", and "red". The "blonde" Mangalica is blonde, the "swallow-bellied" (originally produced by crossing the Blonde Mangalica with the extinct Black Mangalica) has a blonde lower-portion of its body while the upper-portion of its body is black, and the "red" (produced by crossing the Blonde Mangalica with the Szalonta breed) is ginger-colored.
Other varieties (including "black", "wolf", and "baris") have become extinct as pure-bred forms, though their reconstruction from selective breeding of mixed varieties is being debated in Hungary.

Breeding and crossbreeding

Bazna pig 
Bazna breed is a Romanian breed of domestic pig, first created in 1872 from crosses between the Mangalitsa sow and Berkshire boar.

References 

Pig breeds
Pig breeds originating in Hungary